Jerome J. Verdier Sr. is a leading human rights activist and environmental lawyer in Liberia. In 2006, Verdier was also selected to serve as chairperson of the Truth and Reconciliation Committee for Liberia.

Verdier is a multiple graduate of the University of Liberia. He received his Bachelor of Business Administration in 1988 as well as a Bachelor of Laws degree in the same year from the school's Louis Arthur Grimes School of Law. He received a Bachelor of Science in Management from the Georgia Institute of Technology in 2009.

Verdier is a practicing attorney in Liberia and has successfully filed suit against the government on multiple occasions.

References

 Biography at elaw.org
 Biography at stopfirestone.org

External links
 "Mercy vs. justice as Liberia heals itself", csmonitor.com, 26 October 2006

Year of birth missing (living people)
Living people
Liberian lawyers
University of Liberia alumni
20th-century Liberian lawyers
21st-century Liberian lawyers